Jama Awil Aden (born 2 September 1948) is a former long-distance runner who competed for Somalia.

Aden was a member of Somalia's first ever Summer Olympic team when he competed at the 1972 Summer Olympics held in Munich. He entered the marathon but was one of the eleven runners who didn't finish the course.  He competed in college running for Fairleigh Dickinson.

He later served as a coach for distance running.

References

Somalian male long-distance runners
1948 births
Living people
Olympic athletes of Somalia
Athletes (track and field) at the 1972 Summer Olympics
Somalian male marathon runners